Andrew is an unincorporated community in Vermilion Parish, Louisiana, United States. It is part of the Abbeville Micropolitan Statistical Area.

References

Acadiana
Unincorporated communities in Vermilion Parish, Louisiana
Unincorporated communities in Louisiana